Selenia may refer to:
 Selenia (company), an Italian electronics company merged into Alenia Aeronautica
 Selenia (moth), a genus of moths
 Selenia (plant), a genus of plants
 Selenia, a character from the film Arthur and the Invisibles